The Hellinikon Fencing Hall was a multi-purpose indoor sporting arena that was located adjacent to the Hellinikon Olympic Arena, in Hellinikon, Athens, Greece. The venue was part of the Hellinikon Events Hall of the Hellinikon Olympic Complex. It was demolished in 2022.

History
The facility was officially opened on July 30, 2004. It hosted the fencing matches at the 2004 Summer Olympics in Athens, Greece. The facility seated 3,800 for the preliminary matches, and 5,000 for the final matches. During the 2004 Summer Paralympic Games, the Fencing Hall was the venue for wheelchair fencing.

References

2004 Summer Olympic official report. Volume 2. p. 318.
Olympicproperties.gr profile 

Buildings and structures completed in 2004
Venues of the 2004 Summer Olympics
Olympic fencing venues
Indoor arenas in Greece
Basketball venues in Greece
Fencing
Handball venues in Greece
Volleyball venues in Greece
Sports venues demolished in 2022
Demolished buildings and structures in Greece